The 2016 Tour of Flanders was a one-day classic cycling race that took place in Belgium on Sunday 3 April 2016. It was the 100th edition of the Tour of Flanders; it was the eighth event of the UCI World Tour and the third of the cobbled one-day classics. It was the second Monument race of the 2016 cycling season.

The race started in Bruges and finished in Oudenaarde. The principal favourites for the overall victory were Fabian Cancellara, Tom Boonen and Peter Sagan.

On the last climb of the Oude Kwaremont, Kwiatkowski was dropped; on the Paterberg, which followed shortly afterwards and was final climb of the race, Sagan dropped Vanmarcke and set off alone towards the finish. Vanmarcke and Cancellara collaborated in an effort to chase him down, but Sagan was able to ride to the finish alone. Cancellara finished second with Vanmarcke third, both more than 20 seconds behind Sagan.

Route

The route of the 100th edition was presented on 29 November 2015 at Brussels Airport. It contained small changes from previous editions: the Tiegemberg in West Flanders was omitted, while in the Flemish Ardennes the flat cobbled sector of the Holleweg was cut from the race and replaced with the Jagerij cobbled road. The change was needed to keep the iconic Molenberg climb in the route due to roadworks.

The race started in the Market Square in Bruges with a neutralised zone, leaving the town to the south. The racing started outside the city and took the riders southwest through Torhout to Roeselare, then east through Ardooie and Tielt, then south-east to Oudenaarde, passing across the first cobbled sector of the day, the flat Huisepontweg. After Oudenaarde, the route continued into a series of circuits through the hilly area to the south and east. The route turned north and, following the climb of the non-cobbled Kortekeer, the riders entered a  section with several cobbled roads. The route then turned back to the south-west, across the flat Haaghoek cobbles and then the non-cobbled climbs of the Leberg, Berendries, Valkenberg, Kaperij and Kanarieberg. At the summit of the Paterberg, there were  left to the finish.

There were six more climbs in the next  loop. The first of these was the Koppenberg, which includes the steepest roads of the race, with gradients of 22%. This was followed by the flat cobbles of the Mariaborrestraat and the climbs of the Steenbeekdries and the Taaienberg. The roads took the riders south into Ronse for the climb of the Kruisberg, then north-west to the foot of the Oude Kwaremont. These took place over mainly flat roads, with a long finishing straight on the outskirts of Oudenaarde.

Climbs and cobbled roads
In total, the race included eighteen categorized climbs.

Additionally, there were seven sectors of flat cobbled roads:

Participating teams
The 18 UCI WorldTeams were automatically invited and were obliged to participate in the race. An additional seven UCI Professional Continental teams were given wildcard entries: two Belgian teams ( and ), a Dutch team, a German team, a French team, an Italian team and a Polish team. With eight on each team, the peloton at the start of the race included 200 riders. Of these, 118 reached the finish line.

Pre-race favourites
The principal favourites for the race were Tom Boonen and Fabian Cancellara, both of whom had won the race on three previous occasions. Cancellara was in strong form, having won the Strade Bianche and having come fourth in E3 Harelbeke and Gent–Wevelgem the previous week. Boonen, however, was not in strong form: he had not won a major classic since 2012 and had not performed strongly in the previous week's races. Nevertheless, Cycling Weekly wrote "you can never write the three-time Flanders winner off in a race like this." The other former winners present at the start were Alexander Kristoff, the defending champion, and Cancellara's teammate Stijn Devolder. Kristoff's strong sprint gave him an advantage if he was in a group that finished together; he had, however, been ill in the previous week. Devolder, meanwhile, was expected to work for Cancellara.

The other major favourite for the race was Peter Sagan, the reigning world road race champion. Sagan had come second in E3 Harelbeke and first in Gent–Wevelgem. He had the advantage of being able to follow attacks and also to wait to use his strong sprint if he came to the finish with other riders.

Other riders with a chance of victory included Michał Kwiatkowski, who had won E3 Harelbeke ahead of Sagan and who had a strong team with Geraint Thomas, Ian Stannard and Luke Rowe; Greg Van Avermaet; Boonen's teammates Niki Terpstra and Zdeněk Štybar; Sep Vanmarcke; and Tiesj Benoot.

Race summary

Before the race began, there was a minute's silence in memory of Antoine Demoitié, a  rider who had been killed in a crash with a motorbike during Gent–Wevelgem. After , the riders arrived in Hooglede, the birthplace of Daan Myngheer, a rider for  who had died following a heart attack in the Critérium International; the peloton rode slowly through the town in memory of him.

The day's breakaway took a long time to form: over an hour into the day's racing, with more than  covered, a six-man move broke free. The riders were Hugo Houle, Federico Zurlo, Imanol Erviti (Movistar), Lukas Pöstlberger (Bora–Argon 18), Gijs Van Hoecke (Topsport Vlaanderen–Baloise) and Wesley Kreder (Roompot–Oranje Peloton). They earned a lead of over four minutes, but broke apart as the day's climbs began.

During the middle part of the race several riders were forced to withdraw after crashes. Arnaud Démare, the winner of Milan–San Remo, crashed after , while Marcus Burghardt (BMC) and Tiesj Benoot crashed on the Wolvenberg shortly afterwards. Less than  later, several BMC riders crashed together and four were forced to withdraw. These included Greg Van Avermaet, who broke his collarbone.

On the Molenberg, with more than  remaining, a hard effort by Tony Martin (Etixx–Quick-Step) caused a split in the main peloton, with 25 riders in the front group, but the groups came back together shortly afterwards. André Greipel (Lotto–Soudal) and Nils Politt (Katusha) then attacked on the Leberg and were allowed to go; they were followed by Dmitriy Gruzdev and Dimitri Claeys. These four riders joined up with Houle, Erviti and Van Hoecke from the original break; Houle was dropped soon afterwards to form a six-man leading group, which had a two-minute lead at the foot of the second ascent of the Oude Kwaremont. On the climb, Stijn Vandenbergh (Etixx–Quick-Step) and Dylan van Baarle attacked from the peloton. Another group, including Sep Vanmarcke and Ian Stannard, attacked before the Koppenberg. Stannard then went solo over the top of the climb. Meanwhile, Vandenbergh and Van Baarle caught up with the group of leaders.

There were several more attacks before the climb of the Taaienberg, where a small group of favourites formed and quickly caught Stannard. Shortly afterwards, with  remaining, Michał Kwiatkowski and Peter Sagan attacked together and were joined by Sep Vanmarcke. They crossed the Kruisberg together and caught the remainder of the breakaway with  remaining, 40 seconds ahead of the peloton. On the final climb of the Oude Kwaremont, Kwiatkowski was unable to follow Sagan and Vanmarcke, while Cancellara rode clear of the peloton. Sagan was first to the summit with Vanmarcke; Cancellara was twelve seconds behind. Cancellara was then caught by Niki Terpstra, Erviti and Claeys.

On the final climb, the Paterberg, Sagan rode away from Vanmarcke, who was caught by Cancellara at the top of the climb. They rode in pursuit of Sagan, who had a 15-second lead at the summit. The chasing pair were unable to bring Sagan back and he rode to the finish to win his first Monument. Cancellara finished second, 25 seconds back, with Vanmarcke allowing him to take second place. Kristoff won the sprint for fourth place, ahead of Luke Rowe (Sky), 49 seconds behind Sagan.

Result

Post-race analysis

Rider reactions
Sagan celebrated his victory by doing a wheelie after the finishing line. He said afterwards that it was the hardest Tour of Flanders he had ever raced, having been "full gas" throughout and suggested that Cancellara had made a mistake by not following the attack he had made with Kwiatkowski and Vanmarcke. Cancellara was emotional after finishing his final Tour of Flanders. He said that he had "missed this one second", referring to the attack by Sagan. He said that he and Vanmarcke had done all they could in the chase, but that Sagan was too strong. Vanmarcke, meanwhile, said that he had struggled due to crashes in the middle part of the race and then had suffered cramp when Sagan attacked on the Paterberg. He described the move by Sagan and Kwiatkowski as the "decisive moment in the race".

Boonen, who finished fifteenth, described Sagan as "really strong" and as the "deserved winner"; he said "The way [Sagan] rode up the Paterberg was a good showcase on how to ride a bike". Boonen, meanwhile, turned his attention to Paris–Roubaix the following week. Van Avermaet described himself as "really disappointed" following his crash, which ruled him out of Paris–Roubaix. Luke Rowe's fifth place was Team Sky's best ever performance in the Tour of Flanders; he praised Kwiatkowski's move, but said "there's not much you can do when someone has better legs"; he described Sagan, Cancellara and Vanmarcke as "the three strongest guys in the race". Cycling Weekly described this as "phenomenal"; it was Movistar's best ever result.

World Tour standings
Sagan remained at the top of the 2016 UCI World Tour standings following his victory; his total of 329 points was more than 100 ahead of the next rider, his teammate Alberto Contador. Cancellara moved up from thirteenth to fourth and Vanmarcke from sixteenth to sixth. Sagan's total put Slovakia in third place in the nations' rankings, ahead of Great Britain and Spain, even though he was the only Slovakian to have scored World Tour points.

See also
2016 in men's road cycling

References

Sources

Footnotes

External links

 

Tour of Flanders
Tour of Flanders
Tour of Flanders